Micki Marlo (August 12, 1928 – September 20, 2016) was an American singer and model, best known in the 1950s, who received attention for both her singing and her beauty.

She was a member of WPEN Philadelphia's "950 Club", a radio precursor of American Bandstand. She worked the variety show circuit in the 1950s, appearing on the original Tonight Show with Steve Allen. Micki was a member of the cast of Ziegfeld Follies of 1957

Recordings
She recorded a duet with Paul Anka, "What You've Done To Me" in 1957. Her ABC-Paramount album, Married I Can Always Get, featured her on the cover in a photo wearing a low-cut, bare-shouldered wedding dress. The liner notes make frequent references to her physical charms. "Little By Little", a Nappy Brown cover, was her only hit.

Latter years work
In the early 1960s she appeared on the game show Charge Account, and paired up with Ed Hurst again to co-host Summer Time On The Pier, another live dance show, this time from Atlantic City, New Jersey, for WRCV-TV.

Death
Marlo died in Dade County, Florida, on September 20, 2016, at the age of 88.

References

External links
An Interview with Micki Marlo - Part One (2011)
An Interview with Micki Marlo - Part Two (2011)

1928 births
2016 deaths
American women singers
Ziegfeld girls
Musicians from Philadelphia
Singers from Pennsylvania
21st-century American women